Hîrjău (Yerzhovo) is a commune in the Rîbnița District of Transnistria, Moldova. It is composed of three villages: Hîrjău, Mihailovca Nouă (Нова Михайлівка, Новая Михайловка) and Sărăței (Сарацея). It has since 1990 been administered as a part of the self-proclaimed Pridnestrovian Moldavian Republic (PMR).

References

Communes of Transnistria
Bratslav Voivodeship
Baltsky Uyezd
Rîbnița District